The Guards Division was an infantry division of the British Army that was formed in the Great War in France in 1915 from battalions of the Guards regiments from the Regular Army. The division served on the Western Front for the duration of the First World War. The division's insignia was the "All Seeing Eye".

There was also a Guards Division in the Second World War which was formed on 12 June 1945 from the Guards Armoured Division which had undergone reorganisation.

History

First World War

Formation
In July 1915, during the First World War (1914–1918), George V approved the formation of a Guards Division and in August 1915 the division was formed at Lumbres, near St Omer, France.

The 4th (Guards) Brigade was transferred complete from the 2nd Division and redesignated as the 1st Guards Brigade; the 2nd Guards Brigade was formed with two battalions from England and two more transferred from 1st (Guards) Brigade, 1st Division; and the 3rd Guards Brigade likewise with two more battalions from England and two transferred from 20th Brigade, of the 7th Division. Soon after formation, each brigade formed a machine gun (M.G.) company of 16 machine guns, and between March and May 1916 each brigade was also provided with a Trench Mortar (T.M.) Battery of eight 3" Stokes Mortars.

The division was provided with three artillery brigadesLXXIV, LXXV and LXXVI Brigades, RFA each of four batteries of four 18 pounder gunsfrom the 16th (Irish) Division and a howitzer brigadeLXI (Howitzer) Brigade, RFA of four batteries of four 4.5" howitzersfrom the 11th (Northern) Division which remained in England when the division was posted to Gallipoli.  16th (Irish) Division also provided the Divisional Ammunition Column, two field companies of Royal Engineers and the signal company (Royal Engineer Signals Service).  The third field company joined from 7th Division. The pioneers were the 4th Battalion, Coldstream Guards which joined from England on 18 August.

War service
In 1915, the Guards Division took part in the Battle of Loos (26 September8 October) and Hohenzollern Redoubt (1819 October).  In 1916, it fought in the later stages of the Battle of the Somme, in particular the Battle of Flers–Courcelette (1516 and 2022 September), the Battle of Morval (2528 September), and the Capture of Lesboeufs (25 September).  In 1917, it saw action in the Battle of Passchendaele (or the Third Battle of Ypres) including the Battle of Pilckem Ridge (31 August2 July), the Battle of Poelcappelle (9 October), and the First Battle of Passchendaele (12 October). It then took part in the Battle of Cambrai (24 November3 December).

In February 1918, British divisions on the Western Front were reduced from a 12-battalion to a 9-battalion basis (brigades from four to three battalions). As a result, the 4th Guards Brigade was formed on 8 February 1918 by taking a battalion from each of the brigades: 
 3rd Battalion, Coldstream Guards from 1st Guards Brigade 
 2nd Battalion, Irish Guards from the 2nd Guards Brigade and 
 4th Battalion, Grenadier Guards from the 3rd Guards Brigade.
The 4th Guards Brigade was transferred to the 31st Division at noon on the same day.  On 25 February, the pioneer battalion4th Battalion, Coldstream Guards was reorganized from a four-company to a three-company basis.

1918 saw the return of the war of movement. It had to withstand the German Army's Spring Offensive in the 
First Battles of the Somme (125 March) then switched over to counter-attack in the Second Battles of the Somme (2123 August), the Second Battle of Arras (26 August3 September), the Battles of the Hindenburg Line (12 September12 October), and in the Final Advance in Picardy including the battles of the Selle and of the Sambre.  Its final action was the Capture of Maubeuge on 9 November.  It ended the war with VI Corps in the British Third Army.

Post-war
At the Armistice of 11 November 1918, the division was in and around Maubeuge, and on 17 November it regained 4th Guards Brigade which was broken up and the battalions returned to their original brigades. The next day it began the march on Germany and crossed the frontier on 11 December. By 19 December it had reached the Cologne area. Units started returning to England on 20 February 1919 and the last had completed the move by 29 April.

Second World War
The Guards Division was reformed during the Second World War on 12 June 1945 by the reorganization and redesignation of the Guards Armoured Division. The division retained all of its original units, but with some changes:
 5th Guards Armoured Brigade (three armoured battalions and one motorized infantry battalion) was converted to infantry as 5th Guards Brigade
 32nd Guards Infantry Brigade remained unchanged except that 2nd Battalion, Welsh Guards (originally the reconnaissance unit of the Guards Armoured Division) was converted to infantry and joined the brigade
 2nd Household Cavalry Regiment was transferred from XXX Corps on 12 June 1945 as the new reconnaissance unit
 6th Guards Tank Brigade (three tank battalions) was converted to infantry as 6th Guards Brigade and joined the division on 19 June
 92nd (5th London) Field Regiment, Royal Artillery joined the division on 12 June from 5th Infantry Division as the third field artillery regiment to match three infantry brigades
Major-General Sir Allan Adair remained in command of the reorganized division. The division was broken up in December 1946.

Orders of battle

1945
Order of battle when reformed from the Guards Armoured Division, June 1945

5th Guards Brigade
 1st Battalion, Grenadier Guards
 2nd Battalion, Grenadier Guards
 1st Battalion, Coldstream Guards
 2nd Battalion, Irish Guards
Royal Artillery
 55th (Wessex) Field Regiment, Royal Artillery
 92nd (5th London) Field Regiment, Royal Artillery
 153rd (Leicestershire Yeomanry) Field Regiment, Royal Artillery
 75th Anti-Tank Regiment, Royal Artillery
 94th Light Anti-Aircraft Regiment, Royal Artillery
Royal Engineers
 14th Field Company
 615th Field Company
 148th Field Park Company
 11th Bridging Troop
Signals
 Guard Division Signals, RCS
Reconnaissance
 2nd Household Cavalry Regiment
Infantry
 1st Independent MG Company

6th Guards Brigade
 4th Battalion, Grenadier Guards
 4th Battalion, Coldstream Guards
 3rd Battalion, Scots Guards

32nd Guards Infantry Brigade
 5th Battalion, Coldstream Guards
 2nd Battalion, Scots Guards
 3rd Battalion, Irish Guards
 2nd Battalion, Welsh Guards

Notable members
2nd Lieutenant Jack Kipling, son of the famous author Rudyard Kipling, served with the Guards Division in France as a platoon commander in the 2nd Battalion, Irish Guards. He was aged just 18, his birthday being only a month before, and was killed in the 1915 Battle of Loos, yet exactly how he died still remains a mystery even nearly 100 years later.

Commanders
The division had the following General Officers Commanding (GOCs):

See also

 List of British divisions in World War I
 List of British divisions in World War II
 Guards Division for the administrative formation

Notes

References

Bibliography

External links
 
 
 

 
Infantry divisions of the British Army in World War I
Infantry divisions of the British Army in World War II
Military units and formations established in 1915
Military units and formations disestablished in 1919
Military units and formations established in 1945
Military units and formations disestablished in 1946
1915 establishments in the United Kingdom